Operation Haifisch (Shark) was a German codename for the cover operation against the United Kingdom in World War II, intended (like Operation Harpune) to conceal preparations for Operation Barbarossa, the invasion of the Soviet Union. 

Elaborated by Wilhelm Keitel and designated to begin in April 1941, the aim was to strike at England's southern coast in four places between Folkestone and Worthing. The Kriegsmarine's main task was to ferry the invasion forces after loading them at major ports between Cherbourg and Rotterdam.

See also
Operation Sea Lion
Operation Harpune

References
Alan F. Wilt "Shark" and `Harpoon": German Cover Operations Against Great Britain in 1941

Haifisch
Harpune,Operation